Central Vermont Railway stations and depots are any of the buildings that historically served as train stations of the Central Vermont Railway, including:

Amherst station (Massachusetts)
Bellows Falls station
Union Station (Brattleboro, Vermont)
Essex Junction station
Montpelier station (Vermont)
New London Union Station
Central Vermont Railway Depot (Northfield, Vermont)
Union Station (Palmer, Massachusetts)
Randolph station (Vermont)
St. Albans station (Vermont)
Waterbury station (Vermont)
White River Junction station
Windsor station (Vermont)

Central Vermont Railway
Railway stations
Railway stations